P&O Maritime Logistics (formerly known as P&O Maritime) has been operating in the maritime industry since the 1960s. The company has evolved over the years, they are active in the offshore renewables space and provide a wide variety vessels to support offshore activities within Europe including; survey, maintenance, operation, construction, power cable lay and inspection services. P&O Maritime was formed in the 1960s, and has offices worldwide. In 2019, following parent company DP World's acquisition of Topaz Energy & Marine, Topaz and P&O Marine were merged to create the new P&O Maritime Logistics.

Company Fleet
 

Government Shipping Services Fleet

Research & Survey

Port Services Fleet

Cargo Services Fleet:

Offshore Renewables Support

Offshore Fleet & Cable Lay
Offshore Renewables Support

Defence Fleet
DMS Maritime owns and/or manages and operates a fleet of more than 550 vessels, including multi purpose vessels, harbour and ocean tugs, torpedo recovery vessels, landing craft, diving launches, workboats and general harbour support vessels of various sizes, a submarine trial support vessel, sailing vessels, an Antarctic survey vessel and rigid hull inflatable boats.

References

External links 
P&O Maritime - Corporate site
P&O Maritime Fleet List - List of most of the companies current fleet
P&O Maritime - Media Release Archives - A Media Release Archive from 2004–2007
MV Oceanic Viking
CS European Supporter
Aurora Australis (icebreaker)
RV Cefas Endeavour
Peninsular and Oriental Steam Navigation Company

P&O (company)
Transport companies established in the 1960s